Clyde's Bridge, not to be confused with the similarly named Clyde Bridge further downstream, is the first major road bridge spanning the River Clyde in South Lanarkshire, Scotland. The bridge carries the A702 from Duneaton Roundabout to Wandel.

References 

Bridges across the River Clyde
Buildings and structures in South Lanarkshire
Road bridges in Scotland
Transport in South Lanarkshire